Signora Enrica is a 2010 Italo-Turkish comedy-drama film, written and directed by Ali İlhan, starring Claudia Cardinale as an elderly Italian woman who takes in a young Turkish exchange student.

Production
The film was shot on location in Istanbul, Turkey and Rimini, Italy.

Plot 
Abandoned with a son by her husband years ago, Signora Enrica is notorious in her native Rimini for refusing to allow any men into her house ever since. She rents out rooms to female students, while also working as a tailor and at the market. She decides to make an exception to her age-old rule for Ekin, a Turkish student who comes to her house.

Though Ekin doesn’t speak Italian, he falls in love with Valentina, another tenant in the house, and seeks ways of communicating with her. Signora Enrica teaches Ekin Italian, dancing, and the subtleties of Italian cuisine – in other words, everything he needs to know to reach out to Valentina. Signora Enrica’s son Giovanni begins to begrudge his mother for giving a stranger the love she has denied everybody else for years.

Cast 
 Claudia Cardinale - Signora Enrica
 İsmail Hacıoğlu - Ekin
 Lavinia Longhi - Valentina
 Teoman Kumbaracıbaşı - Giovanni

Release

Festival screenings 
 47th Antalya "Golden Orange" International Film Festival (October 9–14, 2010)

See also 
 Turkish films of 2010-2011
 2010 in film

References

External links
 
 Filmpot page for the film

2010 films
2010s Turkish-language films
2010s Italian-language films
2010 comedy-drama films
Films shot in Turkey
Turkish comedy-drama films
2010 multilingual films
Turkish multilingual films